Giannicolò Conti (1617–1698) was a Roman Catholic cardinal.

Biography
On 26 Apr 1639, was consecrated bishop by Girolamo Farnese, Cardinal-Priest of Sant'Agnese fuori le mura, with Emilio Bonaventura Altieri, Bishop of Camerino, and Federico Borromeo (iuniore), Titular Patriarch of Alexandria, serving as co-consecrators.

While bishop, he was the principal consecrator of Pietro Lanfranconi, Bishop of Terni (1667).

References

1617 births
1698 deaths
17th-century Italian cardinals